See also Per Johansson (disambiguation).
Pär Ingemar Johansson (born 6 March 1970 in Sundsvall (grew up in Delsbo)) is a Swedish screenwriter, lecturer, theatre producer and theatre director. He works in Hudiksvall. He started the theatrical organization Glada Hudik-teatern in 1996. In 2011 he received H. M. The King's Medal.

References

External links
Official website

Swedish screenwriters
Swedish male screenwriters
Swedish theatre managers and producers
Swedish theatre directors
1970 births
Living people
People from Sundsvall